The 2022 Canada Summer Games or informally as Niagara 2022 is the summer season portion of the Canada Games and a multi-sport event for amateur athletes.

The games took place from August 6–21, 2022 in the Niagara Region of Ontario, Canada, with some diving competitions taking place in Toronto. There were 17 sports and 20 disciplines in total. The 28th edition of the Canada Games also marked the third time in history the event has taken place in the province of Ontario and the first time in 21 years.

The games were originally scheduled to be held in Niagara Region, Ontario, from August 6 to 21, 2021. However, in September 2020 the Canada Games Council announced that the 2021 Canada Summer Games had been postponed to 2022 as a result of the COVID-19 pandemic in Canada.

Bidding process
On February 10, 2016, the Canada Games Council officially launched the bid process for the rights to host the event, with bids having until May 20, 2016, to declare interest. On May 24, 2016, the Canada Games Council announced a total of four bids were received: Niagara Region, a combined bid from four cities (Cambridge, Kitchener, Waterloo and Guelph), Greater Sudbury and Ottawa.

In August 2016, the Canada Games Council Technical Review Committee made visits to all four bid regions to evaluate the bids. In September 2016, the Canada Games Council board of directors passed all four bid groups to the next level of reviews. On March 31, 2017, Niagara Region was announced as the successful bidder.

Venues 
A total of 248 events in 17 sports and 20 disciplines were contested at the 2022 Canada Summer Games.

The following venues were designated for the 2022 Summer Games. Out of the 12 municipalities in the Niagara, eight were host cities/towns for sporting competitions. Grimsby, Niagara Falls, Niagara-on-the-Lake. Pelham St. Catharines, Thorold, Wainfleet and Welland. One competition venue, the Etobicoke Olympium was located in Toronto. The following is a venue map, produced by the local organizing committee.

Grimsby

Niagara Falls

Niagara-on-the-Lake

Pelham

St. Catharines

Thorold

Toronto

Wainfleet

Welland

Sports
A total of 248 events over 17 sports and 20 disciplines were contested. Box lacrosse returned to the Canada Summer Games for the first time since the 1985 Canada Summer Games. Rugby sevens will also make its Canada Games debut, with the women's competition being included.

Calendar
Source:

Participating provinces and territories
All 13 of Canada's provinces and territories competed. The number of competitors each province or territory entered is in brackets.

 (385)
 (382)
 (370)
 (346)
 (271)
 (75)
 (354)
 (31)
 (396)
 (266)
 (382)
 (377)
 (137)

Medal table
The following is the final medal table for the 2022 Canada Summer Games. Nunavut won its first ever Canada Summer Games medal, a gold, when wrestler Eekeeluak Avalak won his event. The gold medal was the territory's second ever medal at the Canada Games, following a bronze medal in judo at the 2007 Canada Winter Games.

Medallists

Athletics

Male

Female

Baseball

Basketball

Box lacrosse

Canoe Kayak

Canoe

Kayak

Cycling

Mountain biking

Road

Diving

Golf

Rowing

Rugby Sevens

Sailing

Soccer

Softball

Swimming

Male

Female

Mixed

Tennis

Triathlon

Volleyball

Wrestling

Male

Female

References

Notes

2022
Canada Summer Games
Canada Summer Games
Canada Summer Games
Canada Summer Games
2022 in Ontario